Noctua (Latin: owl) was a constellation near the tail of Hydra in the southern celestial hemisphere, but is no longer recognized. It was introduced by Alexander Jamieson in his 1822 work, A Celestial Atlas, and appeared in a derived collection of illustrated cards, Urania's Mirror. Now designated Asterism a, the owl was composed of the stars 4 Librae and 54–57 Hydrae, which range from 4th to 6th magnitude.

The French astronomer Pierre Charles Le Monnier had introduced a bird on Hydra's tail as the constellation Solitaire, named for the extinct flightless bird, the Rodrigues solitaire, but the image was that of a rock thrush which had been classified in the genus Turdus, giving rise to the constellation name Turdus Solitarius, the solitary thrush. It has also been depicted as a mockingbird. The boundaries of the constellation were defined as longitude 0° to 26°30' and from the ecliptic to 15° S.

References

External links
 Ian Ridpath's Star Tales – Noctua
 Obsolete Constellations: Noctua, the owl
 

Former constellations